Pietro Participazio (reigned 939–942) was, by tradition, the twentieth Doge of Venice of the Republic of Venice.

History
He was son of the eighteenth Doge, Orso II Participazio.

It seems that during his reign he did nothing worthy of note; he died three years after his election and was buried in the Felice church Saint di Ammiana, where his father was buried before him.

References
Medieval Lands Project

10th-century Doges of Venice
942 deaths
House of Participazio